Dr. Sayed Makhdoom Raheen (Persian: سید مخدوم رهین) is a Persian author and an Afghan politician. He is an ethnic Tajik and is a dual citizen (holds American citizenship).

Life 

He was born in 1946 in the Afghan capital of Kabul. He graduated from Habibia High School between the mid-1950s to the early-1960s. During the Soviet–Afghan War form 1979-1989 and communist government of Kabul, he was head of Radio Kabul-e-Azad (Free Kabul). Until March 2015 he was the Afghan Minister of Information and Culture. He previously served Afghanistan's ambassador in India prior to holding the office of Minister of Information and Culture for second time.

References 

20th-century Persian-language writers
Afghan diplomats
Living people
University of Tehran alumni
Culture ministers of Afghanistan
Information ministers of Afghanistan
Ambassadors of Afghanistan to India
1946 births
Faculty of Letters and Humanities of the University of Tehran alumni